Bill Cummings is an American philanthropist; his charitable foundation has nearly $2 billion in assets. The Cummings School of Veterinary Medicine and the Cummings Veterinary Medical Center, both at Tufts University, are both named after him, because of major gifts he made to those institutions. In 2018, Forbes Magazine ranked him on its annual Top Givers List (which was based on gifts made in 2017). On April 6, 2022, Roger Williams University in Bristol, Rhode Island, announced a $20 million philanthropic partnership with the Cummings Foundation and the renaming of its School of Architecture, Art, and Historic Preservation to the Cummings School of Architecture and Real Estate in Cummings' honor.

Early life
Cummings grew up in Medford, Massachusetts and graduated from Tufts University in 1958 with a Bachelor of Arts in Economics.

Career

Real estate

Cummings founded his real estate company, Cummings Properties, in 1970. The company, Cummings Properties, started with one small building in Woburn, Massachusetts, and has expanded to include 11 million square feet across 11 Boston communities. In 1996, Cummings bought the former factory of the United Shoe Machinery Corporation in Beverly, Massachusetts; it is now known as Cummings Center.

Philanthropy
Cummings and his wife Joyce established the Cummings Foundation in 1986, pledging to give 10 percent of their income to it annually but eventually committed to most of the family's commercial real estate holdings to the foundation.

In 2004, Cummings made his largest gift to date, a $50 million donation to Tufts' veterinary school; it was the largest endowment in the institution's history.

In 2011, they signed The Giving Pledge, reflecting their desire to donate substantially all of their wealth to charity.

In 2012, the foundation started its "$100K for 100" program, which gives out 100 grants of $100,000 every year to nonprofits supporting human services, education, healthcare, and social justice in Boston.

His foundation gave $15 million, which Bill & Melinda Gates Foundation then matched, to establish University of Global Health Equity in Rwanda. The school graduated its first class of master's students in 2017.

In 2017, his foundation gave $35 million to charity.

As of 2018, Cummings Foundation is one of the largest foundations in New England, and has donated over $225 million. The foundation also has several subsidiaries, including the nonprofit New Horizons retirement communities.

In November 2019, Cummings was recognized by the New England Real Estate Journal with the Lifetime Achievement Award.

In April 2022, the Cummings Foundation and Roger Williams University announced a $20 million partnership and the renaming of the RWU School of Architecture, Art, and Historic Preservation to the Cummings School of Architecture and Real Estate.

Writer
Cummings published his autobiography, Starting Small and Making it Big, in 2018.

References

American real estate businesspeople
Giving Pledgers
21st-century philanthropists
People from Medford, Massachusetts
Living people
Philanthropists from Massachusetts
Tufts University alumni
American company founders
Year of birth missing (living people)
20th-century American philanthropists